Feld is a surname of German origin. The name means "field" in English.

 Feld Entertainment, entertainment company formed by Israel and Irvin Feld

People
 A. Spencer Feld (1891–1987), New York politician
 Bernard T. Feld (1919–1993), American physicist
 Brad Feld (born 1965), American venture capitalist
 Donald Lee Feld, better known as Donfeld (1934–2007), American costume designer
 Fritz Feld (1900–1993), German-American actor
 Irvin Feld, co-founder of an American entertainment company
 Jindřich Feld (1925–2007), Czech composer
 Judy Feld Carr (born 1938), Canadian musicologist and Jewish activist
 Kenneth Feld (born 1948), American entertainment entrepreneur
 Mark Feld, better known under his stage name Marc Bolan (1947–1977), English musician with T.Rex
 Val Feld (1947–2001), Welsh politician

Fictional characters
 Zieg Feld, a character in The Legend of Dragoon
 Dart Feld, a character in The Legend of Dragoon

See also
 Feld-Tai reciprocity or Feld-Tai reciprocity theorem; in Reciprocity (electromagnetism)
Feldt
Felt (disambiguation)